The 1934 European Figure Skating Championships were held in Seefeld, Austria (men) and in Prague (women and pairs). Elite senior-level figure skaters from European ISU member nations, as well as the United States, competed for the title of European Champion in the disciplines of men's singles, ladies' singles, and pair skating.

Results

Men

Ladies

Pairs

References

External links
 results

European Figure Skating Championships, 1934
European Figure Skating Championships, 1934
European Figure Skating Championships
International figure skating competitions hosted by Austria
Innsbruck-Land District